Richard David Emery (born March 5, 1946) is an American lawyer. He is a founding partner of Emery, Celli, Brinckerhoff Abady Ward & Maazel LLP. He was the Chair of Civilian Complaint Review Board from 2014 to 2016.

Emery was part of New York Governor Mario Cuomo's State Commission on Government Integrity in the late 1980s. He was also part of the part of New York Governor Eliot Spitzer's Transition Committee for Government Reform Issues. He was a member of the New York State Commission on Judicial Conduct for 13 years until March, 2017.

Early life and education 
Emery was born in Boston, Massachusetts on March 5, 1946. He received a B.A. from Brown University in 1967 and received a J.D., cum laude, in 1970 from Columbia University Law School, where he was named a Harlan Fiske Stone Scholar. Following law school, he became a law clerk for Gus J. Solomon of the U.S. District Court for the District of Oregon.

Career 
After graduating from Columbia Law School, Emery moved to Washington and founded the Institutional Legal Services Project, a state-financed public-interest firm that represented people who were incarcerated in prisons, mental institutions and juvenile facilities. After directing the project for six years, he moved back to New York in 1977 and joined the New York Civil Liberties Union as a staff attorney and worked there for a decade.

In 1987, Emery was offered a seat on Governor Mario Cuomo's State Commission on Government Integrity. He accepted the offer and resigned from New York Civil Liberties Union. The same year he became of counsel to Lankenau, Kovner & Bickford, and, thereafter, a partner, focusing on civil and civil rights cases at the firm. There, he represented Robert McLaughlin who was wrongfully convicted. He obtained his release and one of the first large awards of compensation for wrongful conviction. 

One of his most notable cases at the firm was a lawsuit charging that the Board of Estimate violated "one person, one vote," by granting the Staten Island Borough President, who represented fewer than 400,000 people, the same power as the Brooklyn Borough President, who represented more than two million. In 1989, Emery won the case arguing in the U.S. Supreme Court and resulting in the unanimous invalidation of the Board on one person-one vote constitutional grounds.

In 1996, Emery represented Laurance Rockefeller, Jr. and presidential candidate Steve Forbes in their bids to gain ballot access. Emery left Lankenau, Kovner & Bickford and founded Emery, Celli, Brinckerhoff & Abady in 1997.

In 2000, he represented John McCain in his bid to gain access to the 2000 New York Republican presidential primary ballot and in 2001, Emery represented over 60,000 misdemeanor detainees in a case against New York City's strip search policy. Emery won the case and New York City agreed to pay $50 million to 50,000 people who had been illegally strip-searched. Emery also represented the three Jackson brothers starved by foster parents in New Jersey in K.J. et al. v. Division of Youth and Family Services et al.

In March 2004, Emery was appointed to the New York State Commission on Judicial Conduct, by New York State Senate Minority Leader John L. Sampson, and served through to March 2016. In November 2006, newly elected Governor of New York Eliot Spitzer appointed Emery to his Transition Committee for Government Reform Issues. After Spitzer resigned in March 2008, Governor David Paterson appointed Emery to the New York State Commission on Public Integrity.

In 2010, Emery won a civil-rights lawsuit in over strip searches performed on nonviolent, low-level offenders at the Rikers Island jail facility. As a result of the lawsuit, the city agreed to pay out $33 million on behalf of more than 100,000 plaintiffs. Emery represented Roger Clemens' trainer in a defamation lawsuit about steroid use and Duke Lacrosse player Reade Seligmann in a civil suit for wrongful prosecution. Emery also represented Cooper Union in a suit to restore tuition-free education.

Emery was appointed as the Chair of Civilian Complaint Review Board (CCRB) in 2014 by the Mayor of New York City, Bill de Blasio. As the chairman of the CCRB, Emery had aggressive investigations conducted into police misconduct including the use of chokeholds, false statements made by police, and unlawful searches. Emery resigned from the Board on April 13, 2016.

Emery is a member of the City Club, an organization that works on preservation issues in New York City and represented the Club in its environmental suit to block a park Barry Diller planned to build in the Hudson River. He is also the founder and president of the West End Preservation Society.  Emery has taught as an adjunct at the New York University and University of Washington schools of law as well as currently at Fordham University Law School and Cardozo Law School. Emery is a columnist for the New York Law Journal writing on Judicial Conduct.

Personal life 
He married actress Lori Singer in 1980. The couple had a son, Jacques Singer-Emery in 1991, before divorcing in 1996. Emery married Melania Levitsky in 2002 and had a daughter, Nikita Lev Emery in 2004, later divorcing in 2020. He is the grandson of mathematician Richard Courant and the stepson of the mathematician Jürgen Moser.

Awards and honors 
1987 - David S. Michaels Memorial Award, January 1987, for Courageous Effort in Promotion of Integrity in the Criminal Justice System from the Criminal Justice Section of the New York State Bar Association
1989 - The Park River Democrats Public Service Award, June 1989
1989 - "I Love an Ethical New York" Award
2000 - Common Cause/NY 
2008 - Children's Rights Champion Award
2013 - Landmark West's Unsung Heroes Award for his preservation work 
2016 - City & State NY's Responsible 100 Award

Selected publications 
R. Emery, "Who's Policing the Prosecutors? Civil Forfeiture and Accountability," New York Times, December 10, 2014.
R. Emery, "How we will police the police," New York Daily News, September 10, 2014.
R. Emery, "Come to terms with Mike Bloomberg's move," New York Daily News, November 9, 2008.
R. Emery & I. Maazel, "Why Civil Rights Lawsuits Do Not Deter Police Misconduct: The Conundrum of Indemnification and a Proposed Solution," 28 Fordham Urban Law Journal (2000).
R. Emery & N. Morrison, "Five Cases Follow Traditional Course," New York Law Journal, October 2, 2000.
R. Emery, "The Verdict: Poor Training and Supervision," New York Times, February 26, 2000.
R. Emery, "Dazzling Crime Statistics Come at a Price," New York Times, February 19, 1999
R. Emery & A. Celli, Jr., "Disorderly Conduct Statute and the First Amendment," New York Law Journal, October 20, 1997 
R. Emery, "Four Ways to Clean Up the Police," New York Times, August 26, 1997
R. Emery, "Frank Askin, Defending Rights: A Life in Law and Politics," New York Law Journal, June 13, 1997
R. Emery, "Adversary System: Cameras in the Courtroom after O.J.?" New York Times, October 18, 1995
R. Emery, "Weighted Voting," 159 Touro Law Review (1989)
R. Emery, "In New York City, Power to the People," New York Times, May 6, 1989
R. Emery, "The Even Sadder New York Police Saga," New York Times, December 12, 1987
R. Emery, "End New York City's One-Party System," New York Times, September 19, 1987
R. Emery, "Giuliani's Unfair Tactics," New York Times, October 31, 1985
R. Emery, "Curbing New York's Police," New York Times, May 7, 1985
R. Emery, "Pointless Grand Jury Secrecy," New York Times, February 11, 1985
R. Emery, "Recast New York's Board of Estimate," New York Times, September 15, 1984
R. Emery, "Courts Can't Do It All," New York Times, July 16, 1983
R. Emery & B.J. Ennis, The Rights of Mental Patients: An ACLU Handbook (New York: Avon Books, 1978).

References

External links 
 Richard D. Emery

1946 births
Living people
American lawyers